The 1930 coup d'état, also known as the September Revolution by its supporters, involved the overthrow of the Argentine government of Hipólito Yrigoyen by forces loyal to General José Félix Uriburu. The coup took place on 6 September 1930 when Uriburu led a small detachment of troops into the capital, experiencing no substantial opposition and taking control of the Casa Rosada. Large crowds formed in Buenos Aires in support of the coup. Uriburu's forces took control of the capital and arrested Radical Civic Union supporters. There were no casualties in the coup.

Uriburu's coup was supported by the Nacionalistas. Uriburu himself was part of the Nacionalista Argentine Patriotic League and had the support of a number of Nacionalista military officers. Nacionalista plans for such a coup had been developing since 1927, when politician Juan Carulla approached Uriburu for support of a coup to entrench an Argentine version of Fascist Italy's Charter of Labour. With the onset of the Great Depression in 1929 that impacted Argentina, Yrigoyen lost political support as he retrenched government services which resulted in acceleration of unemployment.

In the aftermath of the coup, major changes to Argentinean politics and government took place, with Uriburu banning political parties, suspending elections, and suspending the 1853 Constitution. Uriburu proposed that Argentina be reorganized along corporatist and fascist lines. The coup marked the start of the Infamous Decade, a 13 year period during which the military ruled Argentina through repression, political corruption and electoral fraud. 

Future Argentinean President Juan Perón took part in the coup on the side of Uriburu.

References

Infamous Decade
Military coups in Argentina
1930 in Argentina
Revolutions in Argentina
Conflicts in 1930
September 1930 events
1930s coups d'état and coup attempts